The Stephen Mather Wilderness is a  wilderness area honoring Stephen Mather, the first director of the National Park Service.  It is located within North Cascades National Park, Lake Chelan National Recreation Area, and Ross Lake National Recreation Area in the North Cascade Range of Washington, United States.

It is bordered by the Pasayten Wilderness to the northeast, the Mount Baker Wilderness to the northwest, the Noisy-Diobsud Wilderness to the west, the Glacier Peak Wilderness to the southwest, and the Lake Chelan-Sawtooth Wilderness to the southeast.

Wildlife
The Stephen Mather Wilderness provides a protected area for a wide variety of wildlife, including elk, mule deer, gray wolf, mountain goat, moose, and bighorn sheep.  Species of wolverine, bat, duck, hawk, owl, frog, loon, chipmunk, coyote, squirrel, bear, falcon and eagle are also fairly common.

There are approximately twenty-eight species and subspecies of fish found in the wilderness, including the threatened bull trout and anadromous runs of coastal cutthroat trout, Dolly Varden, steelhead, and five species of salmon found in the Skagit, Nooksack, and Chilliwack drainages.

Threatened or endangered wildlife species in the area include bull trout (threatened) and northern spotted owl.

Recreation
Common recreational activities in the Stephen Mather Wilderness include backpacking, camping, wildlife watching, climbing, and hunting. Much of the area can only be reached by multiday hikes, often combined with mountaineering, through remote, trailless territory.

See also
 List of U.S. Wilderness Areas

References

External links

 NPS: Stephen Mather Wilderness — North Cascades National Park.
 NPS: Map of Stephen Mather Wilderness
 Wilderness.net: Stephen Mather Wilderness

Wilderness areas of Washington (state)
North Cascades of Washington (state)
North Cascades National Park
Protected areas of Chelan County, Washington
Protected areas of Skagit County, Washington
Protected areas of Whatcom County, Washington
IUCN Category Ib
National Park Service areas in Washington (state)